Alex Bronstein (b. May 28, 1980) is an Israeli computer scientist and serial technologist. He is a professor of Computer Science and Machine Learning at Technion, where he holds the Dan Broida Academic Chair and the Schmidt Chair in Artificial Intelligence. He is also a fellow of the IEEE for his contribution to 3D imaging and geometry processing.

Academic career 
Bronstein received a PhD in Computer Science in 2007, and co-authored the book Numerical Geometry of Non-rigid Shapes (with Ron Kimmel). At Technion, he also won the Hershel Rich Technion innovation award. Prior to his PHD, in 2003, Bronstein appeared in a Reuters interview on the use of geometric approaches in three-dimensional face recognition.

As a Professor of Computer Science, Bronstein has authored over 100 journal, and has over 30 patents to his name. In addition to his academic activities, he co-founded and served as the Vice President of technology in the Silicon Valley start-up company Novafora, from 2005 to 2009. 

Bronstein was also a co-founder of the Israeli startup Invision, developing a coded-light 3D range sensor. The company was acquired by Intel in 2012 and has become the foundation of Intel RealSense technology. Bronstein served as Principal Engineer at Intel between 2012 and 2019, playing a leading role in the development of RealSense. 

Bronstein also co-founded the Israeli startup Videocites, developing  internet-scale B2B video analytics services.

See also

Computer vision
Image processing
Technion

References

External links
 Alex Bronstein's page
 Michael Bronstein's page
 Book "Numerical geometry of non-rigid shapes"
 Reuters interview

Computer vision researchers
Identical twins
Living people
Academic staff of the University of Lugano
1980 births